Lynn Creek is a stream in the U.S. state of Wisconsin. It is a tributary to the Wisconsin River.

Lynn Creek was named in honor of M. H. Lynn, the original owner of the site.

References

Bodies of water of Wood County, Wisconsin
Rivers of Wisconsin